Greg Schultz (born 1981) is an American political advisor.  He served as the campaign manager and general election strategist for the Joe Biden 2020 presidential campaign, the senior advisor to Vice President Biden under President Barack Obama, and the deputy political director in Ohio for the Barack Obama 2008 presidential campaign and the Ohio State Director for the Barack Obama 2012 presidential campaign.

Early life and education 
Schultz was born in Parma, Ohio and raised in North Royalton, Ohio, where he graduated from North Royalton High School. His parents both taught special education and Schultz himself planned on becoming a teacher before pivoting to politics.  

Schultz earned a Bachelor of Arts degree in history and political science from Ohio State University and a Master of Education, also from Ohio State University.  

In 2014, he was awarded the Distinguished Alumni Award from the Ohio State’s Department of Political Science.

Career

Biden 2020 Campaign
Schultz was the architect and national campaign manager of Joe Biden’s primary campaign.  Schultz then shifted to the role of general election strategist and senior advisor, where he oversaw and executed strategy between the Democratic National Committee, state parties, Biden’s own team, and other political players.  Said Biden on Schultz’s role as general election strategist, "Greg's talent and leadership have been an important part of this campaign's success since the beginning, and I'm grateful he's taking on this new role to help ensure we run a well-organized and effective general election campaign to beat Donald Trump and restore the soul of this nation.”  

Schultz spoke about his campaign experience as the inaugural guest on David Plouffe’s podcast, which focuses on the inside workings of presidential campaigns. 

Leading up to the 2020 campaign, Schultz served as the Executive Director of Biden’s American Possibilities PAC.

Obama/Biden Campaigns and Administration
Schultz held the role of Deputy Political Director for the Obama/Biden presidential campaigns in Ohio in 2008 and Ohio State Director in 2012.  He also worked as the state director of the Ohio chapter of Organizing for America. During the 2012 campaign, Schultz stepped in to help with the successful referendum on Ohio’s House Bill 194, a GOP backed piece of legislation that sought to limit voter access across the state.  

In 2013, Greg joined the Obama-Biden administration as senior advisor for Vice President Biden and special assistant to President Barack Obama. His work with the vice president included launching Cancer Moonshot, an initiative to help fight cancer by enabling researchers to easily share resources and information, and co-founding It's On Us, a movement fighting to end rape and sexual assault on college campuses.

Early career

Schultz worked on the Hillary Clinton 2008 presidential campaign from February to March 2008. He has worked in the Ohio Governor's Office and on local and statewide campaigns throughout Ohio.

References 

1981 births
American campaign managers
Joe Biden 2020 presidential campaign
Living people
Ohio State University College of Arts and Sciences alumni
People from Cleveland
Hillary Clinton 2008 presidential campaign
People associated with the 2008 United States presidential election
Ohio State University College of Education and Human Ecology alumni